Offered for Singles  is a 1984 romantic comedy directed by Samson Samsonov and written by Arkady Inin.

Plot 
Vera Golubeva, a textile mill worker, lives in a dormitory for women. In her spare time she plays matchmaker for the other women. Although she does this informally and for free, Vera goes at it professionally: studying the personals in the newspapers, she sends marriage proposals throughout the Soviet Union, and carefully selects suitors. But Vera herself is lonely: walking with brides in their weddings, she has already forgotten to dream about her own family happiness.

One day, in the strictly female dormitory appears a new Commandant, Viktor Petrovich - a picturesque former sailor. At some point in the past a woman left him, and from that point on he has regarded women with the utmost suspicion. At first he fights against the way things are done in the dormitory and tries to close Vera's marriage bureau. But eventually, Viktor begins to understand that Vera is the woman he has been looking for all his life.

Cast
 Natalya Gundareva as Vera Nikolayevna Golubeva
 Aleksandr Mikhailov as Victor Petrovich Frolov, commander
 Tamara Syomina as Larisa Evgenievna, educator
 Yelena Drapeko as Nina
 Frunzik Mkrtchyan as Vartan
 Viktor Pavlov as Ilya Belenky
 Elena Mayorova as Ira Sanyko

Awards 
The film won prizes CCF in Kyiv (1984) and the International Film Festival in Chamrousse (1985)
Natalya Gundareva - best actress in 1984 in a poll of the magazine  Soviet Screen

References

External links
 

Soviet romantic comedy films
1984 romantic comedy films
1984 films
Films directed by Samson Samsonov
Mosfilm films
Russian romantic comedy films
Soviet teen films